Potassium laurate is a metal-organic compound with the chemical formula .  The compound is classified as a metallic soap, i.e. a metal derivative of a fatty acid (lauric acid).

Synthesis
Potassium laurate can be prepared via a reaction of lauric acid and potassium hydroxide.

Physical properties
Soluble in water. Soluble in ethyl benzene.

Forms powder or light-tan paste.

Uses
The compound is used in the cosmetics industry as an emulsifier and surfactant.

Also used as a fungicide, insecticide, and bactericide.

References

Laurates
Potassium compounds